The 1999 Pan American Women's Handball Championship was the fifth edition of the Pan American Women's Handball Championship, held in Buenos Aires, Argentina from 30 March to 3 April 1999. It acted as the American qualifying tournament for the 1999 World Women's Handball Championship.

Standings

Results

Games of Greenland

Final ranking

References

External links
Results on todor66.com

1999 Women
American Women's Handball Championship
American Women's Handball Championship
H
Sports competitions in Buenos Aires
March 1999 sports events in South America
April 1999 sports events in South America